Flexipop (stylized as Flexipop!) was a British pop music magazine that ran from 1980 to 1983, which featured a flexidisc in each issue. The magazine was launched in 1980 by ex-Record Mirror journalists Barry Cain and Tim Lott. One of the most notable issues was the February 1981 disc featuring Adam and the Ants performing a version of the Village People hit "Y.M.C.A.", called "A.N.T.S.".
Flexipop's last released flexidisc was "In The Mix" by Haysi Fantayzee in 1983.

The magazine has maintained a memorable reputation among music collectors because of the flexidisc and the revival of interest in 1980s pop.

Huw Collingbourne, a contributing writer to Flexipop, gave an interview to Stylus magazine about the publication in which he said, "Other music mags may have dabbled in flexis, but Flexipop! made a career of it. We had singles by the top bands of the day—everyone from The Jam to Depeche Mode. A really good flexi would make the magazine fly off the newsstands."

References 

1980 establishments in the United Kingdom
1983 disestablishments in the United Kingdom
Defunct magazines published in the United Kingdom
Flexi discs
Magazines established in 1980
Magazines disestablished in 1983
Music magazines published in the United Kingdom
Periodicals with audio content